Basidiolichens are lichenized members of the Basidiomycota, a much smaller group of lichens than the far more common ascolichens in the Ascomycota.  In arctic, alpine, and temperate forests, the most common basidiolichens are in the agaric genus Lichenomphalia (including former members of Omphalina or Gerronema) and the clavarioid genus Multiclavula.  Several lichenized genera occur in tropical regions, the most common being the foliose Dictyonema. Previously basidiolichens had been classified in their own subclass, Basidiolichenes. Molecular based phylogeny does not support classification of the genera together.

References

External links
BioImages Several photos of Lichenomphalia umbellifera
New Zealand Fungi Images of Lichenomphalia alpina and its synonyms
The Field Museum Photos of several lichens, including Dictyonema

Agaricales
Fungal morphology and anatomy